Chichaklu or Chicheklu, also rendered as Chichiklu, may refer to various places in Iran:

Chichaklu, East Azerbaijan
Chichaklu, Tehran
Chichaklu, Shahin Dezh, West Azerbaijan Province
Chichakluy-e Bash Qaleh, Urmia County, West Azerbaijan Province
Chichakluy-e Hajji Aqa, Urmia County, West Azerbaijan Province
Chichagluy-e Mansur, Urmia County, West Azerbaijan Province